Tim Hartman (born 1965) is a practitioner of the Filipino martial art of modern arnis and balintawak eskrima, and the president of the World Modern Arnis Alliance (WMAA).

In 2000, he tested for his 6th degree black belt and Datu at the Michigan summer camp, making him the highest tested rank in the U.S. under Remy Presas, founder of modern arnis. 

Hartman gives seminars and camps across North America and Europe. In June 2005, Hartman was promoted to 9th degree by the WMAA Advisory Board. This promotion reflected his leadership position within the WMAA, and was not meant to replace the rank that he earned from Presas.

Hartman is a competitor in Nafma, where he holds state, national and a world title. His most recognized success in tournament fighting is in stick fighting, where competitors compete against one another sparring with two padded sticks to score points. He is also a notable practitioner in kata, specifically Filipeno kata, which is the event for which he currently holds the world title.

On April 23, 2007, Hartman was promoted to 9th degree in Kombatan and awarded the Grandmaster title by Presas.

Hartman resides in West Seneca, New York, and teaches at Horizon Martial Arts, the school he founded.

Magazine coverage
 Paul O' Grady, "Modern Arnis: The Next Generation", BlackBelt, August 1998
 Interview in Fighter magazine,  March 2002 
 Dan Anderson, Inside Kung Fu, June 2002
 Fighter magazine, January 2003
 MartialTalk magazine cover photos, July 2003 and February 2004
 Craig T. Marks, "Marissa's Heroes", TaeKwonDoTimes.com, January 2004
 Craig Marks, "Martial Artists United for Stricken Child", BlackBeltMag.com, June 2004
 "How Tim Hartman Sticks to Modern Arnis", Martial Arts Professional, February 2007 
 Datu Kelly Worden, "Who are the Datus of Modern Arnis?", Realfighting, unknown date

Books
 Reynaldo S. Galang, Warrior Arts of the Philippines  Arjee Enterprises (April 2005), paperback: 457 pages : Pg 304 "Insights and Features"

References

External links
History of Modern Arnis
Biography on personal site
World Modern Arnis Alliance (organizational web site)
School in West Seneca
Tim Hartman video

American eskrimadors
1965 births
Living people